Robert Gerry (January 9, 1858 – October 6, 1931) was an American politician in the state of Washington. He served in the Washington House of Representatives from 1895 to 1901.

References

Democratic Party members of the Washington House of Representatives
1931 deaths
1858 births
People from Ellsworth, Maine